Pushmeet Kohli is a computer scientist at Google DeepMind where he heads the "Robust and Reliable AI" and "AI for Science" teams. Before joining DeepMind, he was partner scientist and director of research at Microsoft Research and a post-doctoral fellow at the University of Cambridge. Pushmeet conducts research in the field of machine learning and computer vision. However, he has also made contributions in game theory, discrete algorithms and psychometrics. He is the recipient of the BMVA Sullivan Prize. His papers have received awards at UAI 2018, CVPR 2015, WWW 2014, ISMAR 2011 and ECCV 2010.

Some Notable Projects

 Robust and Reliable AI
Neural Program Synthesis
Probabilistic Programming 
 3D-scene Reconstruction and Understanding 
 MAP Inference in Higher Order Graphical Models
 Community based Crowdsourcing of Data for Training AI Models
 Behavioral analysis and Personality prediction using on Online networks
 Human Pose Estimation using the Kinect 
 Video Editing (Unwrap Mosaics)

References

Computer scientists
Year of birth missing (living people)
Living people
Microsoft employees
People from Cambridge
Alumni of Oxford Brookes University
National Institutes of Technology alumni
Computer vision researchers
Machine learning researchers